Thomas Kelso (6 May 1882 – 29 January 1974) was a Scottish footballer who played as a full back for Manchester City between 1906 and February 1912.

Kelso started his career at Third Lanark before signing for Manchester City in 1906. He made his debut for Manchester City in September 1906 in a 4–1 defeat against Arsenal.

He made 139 league appearances for Manchester City and scored 3 goals. He subsequently returned to Scotland and played for Dundee, Rangers and Dumbarton.

He won one Scotland cap in 1914 in a 0–0 draw against Wales in the 1914 British Home Championship. His uncle Bob Kelso was also a Dundee player and a Scotland international.

References

Scottish footballers
Third Lanark A.C. players
Manchester City F.C. players
Dundee F.C. players
Rangers F.C. players
Dumbarton F.C. players
Scotland international footballers
Scottish Football League players
English Football League players
1882 births
1974 deaths
Association football fullbacks